WZZB (1390 AM, "The Buzz 1390 & 99.3") is a radio station broadcasting an adult contemporary music format in AM stereo. Licensed to Seymour, Indiana, United States, the station is currently owned by Midnight Hour Broadcasting, LLC and features programming from Dial Global.

History
The station was first licensed as WJCD on November 30, 1949. It was part of an AM/FM combo with WJCD-FM broadcasting at 93.7 MHz. On February 15, 1990, the station's call sign was changed to WQKC and on May 24, 1991, the station changed its call sign to the current WZZB. On July 27, 2006, the station was sold to Susquehanna, and on January 11, 2008, the station was sold to Midnight Hour Broadcasting.

References

External links

ZZB
Mainstream adult contemporary radio stations in the United States
Radio stations established in 1949
1949 establishments in Indiana